"Loco" is a song recorded by Australian producer Joel Fletcher and features the vocals of Seany B. The song was digitally released on 28 March 2014.

Background
Following the success of Fletcher's triple platinum-selling single "Swing" featuring Savage, Fletcher teamed up with fellow Melbournite Seany B to produce the follow up "Loco".

Track listing
Digital download
 "Loco" – 3:22

Digital download (remixes)
 "Loco" (Vinai Remix) – 3:18
 "Loco" (Tom Size Festival Trap Remix)– 2:53
 "Loco" (Combo Remix) – 4:48
 "Loco" (Kronic Remix)– 3:52

Weekly charts
"Loco" debuted on the ARIA singles chart at #13 on the 13th of April 2014.

Year-end chart

Certification

References

2014 singles
2014 songs
Ministry of Sound singles